John Fiske may refer to:

 John Fiske (philosopher) (1842–1901), American philosopher and historian
 John Fiske (media scholar) (born 1939), author and Professor Emeritus at the University Wisconsin-Madison
 John Safford Fiske (1838–1907), U.S. diplomat involved in a sex scandal

See also 
 Jack Fisk (born 1945), American movie professional
 John Fisk (died 2004), American radio personality
 Jonathan Fisk (1778–1832), American lawyer and politician from New York